Central Córdoba could refer to:

Railways 
Córdoba Central Railway, an Argentine railway company
Rosario Central Córdoba railway station, a railway station in Rosario

Football clubs 
Central Córdoba de Rosario, an Argentine football club from Rosario, Santa Fe
Central Córdoba de Santiago del Estero, an Argentine football club from Santiago del Estero
Instituto Atlético Central Córdoba, an Argentine football from the city of Córdoba, commonly known as "Instituto"

See also
Córdoba (disambiguation)